Grace is a city in Caribou County, Idaho, United States. The population was 915 at the 2010 census.

History
The area of Grace was once inhabited by the Shoshone Indians. The Oregon Trail passed within  of Grace and the town itself was established with a post office in 1894.  Unlike other nearby historic towns such as Paris and Franklin, Grace was not originally settled by Mormon pioneers, but has since become a predominantly Mormon-populated town.  The economy in and around Grace has traditionally been driven by agriculture, with potatoes, alfalfa, grain, dairy and ranching being the main staples.

Geography

Grace is located near the center of Gem Valley.

In stark contrast to the surrounding mountains, the valley floor in the immediate area of Grace is flat due to volcanic activity in the area some 30,000 years ago.  The lava flow that created the valley also diverted the Bear River from its Pacific drainage into the Great Basin.  This was a significant contributor to the growth of the prehistoric Lake Bonneville of which the Great Salt Lake is a remnant.  Lake Bonneville reached its farthest north advance about four miles (6 km) southwest of Grace before it broke through the earthen barrier at Red Rock pass north of Preston, Idaho.  The Bear River today runs to the north and west of Grace and terminates in the Great Salt Lake.

Grace's neighboring towns are Soda Springs to the north east, Bancroft to the north west, and Preston to the south.

Climate
This climatic region is typified by large seasonal temperature differences, with warm to hot (and often humid) summers and cold (sometimes severely cold) winter.  According to the Köppen Climate Classification system, Grace has a humid continental climate, abbreviated "Dfb" on climate maps.

Geology
There are several extinct volcanoes and lava domes within miles of Grace, which contributes to the dark, nitrogen rich volcanic soil of the area.  This soil type is ideal for farming, particularly potatoes and grain.  Solid basalt can be found beneath the soil throughout most of the valley and exposed outcrops are common.  Other types of rock that are common in the area are limestone and shale.  These non-volcanic rock beds are rich with fossils of prehistoric marine life once native to the inland sea that covered the area some 280 million years ago, ranging from well preserved molluscan shells, to small fish.  Trilobite fossils can often be found in local shale deposits.  The inland sea was also responsible for the vast phosphate deposits that lie north of Grace and are a vital part of the area's economy.

Approximately one-half mile downstream from the point of origin, the Black Canyon forms a sharp gorge with steep walls of black basalt cliffs.

The Wasatch Fault is visible from Grace due to the sharp displacement that creates a small bench at the foot of the mountains.  Mild to moderate earthquakes have been reported to originate at the fault.

Demographics

2010 census
As of the census of 2010, there were 915 people, 366 households, and 266 families residing in the city. The racial makeup of the city was 96.9% White, 0.1% African American, 0.4% Native American, 0.1% Asian, 0.1% Pacific Islander, 1.5% from other races, and 0.8% from two or more races. Hispanic or Latino of any race were 4.2% of the population.

There were 366 households, of which 33.6% had children under the age of 18 living with them, 62.0% were married couples living together, 5.7% had a female householder with no husband present, 4.9% had a male householder with no wife present, and 27.3% were non-families. 24.6% of all households were made up of individuals, and 13.7% had someone living alone who was 65 years of age or older. The average household size was 2.50 and the average family size was 3.00.

The median age in the city was 38.9 years. 26.3% of residents were under the age of 18; 6.1% were between the ages of 18 and 24; 23.3% were from 25 to 44; 25.9% were from 45 to 64; and 18.5% were 65 years of age or older. The gender makeup of the city was 52.3% male and 47.7% female.

2000 census
As of the census of 2000, there were 990 people, 364 households, and 274 families residing in the city. The racial makeup of the city was 95.56% White, 0.20% Native American, 3.33% from other races, and 0.91% from two or more races. Hispanic or Latino of any race were 4.95% of the population.

There were 364 households, out of which 35.2% had children under the age of 18 living with them, 64.3% were married couples living together, 6.3% had a female householder with no husband present, and 24.5% were non-families. 23.4% of all households were made up of individuals, and 14.8% had someone living alone who was 65 years of age or older. The average household size was 2.72 and the average family size was 3.21.

In the city, the population was spread out, with 31.4% under the age of 18, 6.9% from 18 to 24, 23.8% from 25 to 44, 22.5% from 45 to 64, and 15.4% who were 65 years of age or older. The median age was 36 years. For every 100 females, there were 103.3 males. For every 100 females age 18 and over, there were 92.9 males.

The median income for a household in the city was $32,303, and the median income for a family was $39,306. Males had a median income of $33,214 versus $14,306 for females. The per capita income for the city was $13,452. About 5.7% of families and 7.0% of the population were below the poverty line, including 6.8% of those under age 18 and 11.7% of those age 65 or over.

Recreation
Although a small community, Grace offers an array of activities that most can enjoy.  Hunting and fishing are popular among many residents of Grace, as are motorsports. There are several local canyons that are accessible during the summer by truck or ATV, and in the winter by snowmobile. The nearby Alexander Reservoir provides summertime water recreation such as boating and swimming.  The local Niter Ice Cave is accessible year-round and even beginning spelunkers have little trouble exploring the cave. Grace is also home to the Caribou County Fair and Rodeo.

Education

There are 4 schools: Grace Elementary School, Grace Junior High School, Grace High School, and Thatcher Elementary School; they are all under the oversight of Grace School District #148.

Notable people
 Kerry Christensen - yodeler.
 Marc Gibbs - Member of the Idaho House of Representatives; lives in Grace.
 Phil Johnson - basketball player, college and NBA coach.
 Junior Van Noy - Medal of Honor recipient.

References

External links

 Grace Chamber of Commerce

Cities in Caribou County, Idaho